Agonopterix likiangella is a moth in the family Depressariidae. It was described by Alexandr L. Lvovsky and Shu-Xia Wang in 2011. It is found in Yunnan, China.

The wingspan is 20–22 mm. The forewings are white, tinged with yellowish brown. The discal point is white with a thin fuscous border and a large fuscous triangular patch mixed with light scales above the discal point. There is also a black point in the middle of the cell and a narrow fuscous spot near the base, as well as some fuscous points along the costal margin and termen. The hindwings are whitish with a yellow tinge.

Etymology
The species name is derived from Likiang, the type locality.

References

Moths described in 2011
Agonopterix
Moths of Asia